Kivernoll (originally Kiverknoll) is a hamlet in the county of Herefordshire, England. It is part of Much Dewchurch parish. Kivernoll consists of a small number of houses along the B4348, with settlement stretching along the unclassified road to Kilpeck and the byway to Dewsall known as The Rhydd.

Kivernoll contains a number of listed buildings including an 18th-century stable.

There is a one span bridge over the Worm brook constructed in 1823 by a contractor called John Parsons.

There was a Primitive Methodist chapel at the Rhydd, Kivernoll but it has since been converted into a house.

References

External links

Villages in Herefordshire